Bramhall North is an electoral ward in the Metropolitan Borough of Stockport. It elects three Councillors to Stockport Metropolitan Borough Council using the first past the post electoral method, electing one Councillor every year without election on the fourth.

It covers the northern part of Bramhall and includes Bramhall Station to the south of the ward. The ward contains Bramhall High School and four local primary schools.

Together with Bramhall South, Cheadle and Gatley, Cheadle Hulme North, Cheadle Hulme South, Heald Green and Stepping Hill Wards it makes up the Cheadle Parliamentary Constituency.

Councillors
Bramhall North electoral ward is represented in Westminster by Mary Robinson MP for Cheadle.

The ward is represented on Stockport Council by three councillors: Frankie Singleton (Lib Dem), Alanna Vine (Ind), and Linda Holt (Con). Cllr Vine was elected as a Conservative but was suspended from the party on 13 July 2022 due to racist social media posts; she was subsequently expelled on 13 September 2022.

 indicates seat up for re-election.
 indicates councillor defected or was suspended/expelled from their party.

Elections in 2020s

May 2022

May 2021

Elections in 2010s

May 2019

May 2018

May 2016

May 2015

May 2014

May 2012

May 2011

May 2010

Note: The electoral result after many recounts was a tie between Lisa Walker and Pauline Banham, as a result ballots were drawn for the winner of which Lisa Walker then scored one vote higher than Pauline Banham.

Elections in the 2000s

May 2008

May 2007

References

External links
Stockport Metropolitan Borough Council

Wards of the Metropolitan Borough of Stockport